Flag is the ninth studio album by American singer-songwriter James Taylor released on May 1, 1979. The album included songs ("Millworker", "Brother Trucker") from Taylor's music score to Stephen Schwartz's Broadway musical, Working, based on the book by Studs Terkel.

The album was not well received, but it did provide a hit in Taylor's cover version of the Gerry Goffin–Carole King composition "Up on the Roof" (Taylor's final top 40 hit as a solo artist).

"Rainy Day Man", which was originally featured on Taylor's self-titled debut album, was re-recorded.

The signal flag that makes up the cover of the album is "O (Oscar)", standing for man overboard.

On the 12 May 1979 episode of Saturday Night Live, Taylor was the musical guest, and performed three songs from the album, "Up on the Roof", "Millworker", and "Johnnie Comes Back".

Track listing
All songs by James Taylor unless otherwise noted.

Side one
"Company Man" – 3:47
"Johnnie Comes Back" – 3:55
"Day Tripper" (John Lennon, Paul McCartney) – 4:25
"I Will Not Lie for You" – 3:16
"Brother Trucker" – 4:01
"Is That the Way You Look?" – 1:59

Side two
"B.S.U.R. (S.U.C.S.I.M.I.M.)" – 3:23
"Rainy Day Man" (Taylor, Zach Wiesner) – 3:02
"Millworker" – 3:52
"Up on the Roof" (Gerry Goffin, Carole King) – 4:21
"Chanson Française" – 2:05
"Sleep Come Free Me" – 4:43

Personnel 
 James Taylor – lead vocals, acoustic guitar, backing vocals (1, 3-6)
 Don Grolnick – clavinet (1-3, 5), electric piano (1, 5, 7, 8, 11, 12), organ (4, 7, 8, 12), ARP String Ensemble (5), acoustic piano (9), harmonium (9), shoe (9)
 Ralph Schuckett – organ (2)
 Danny Kortchmar – electric guitar (1-5, 7, 8, 10, 12)
 Waddy Wachtel – electric guitar (2, 10), acoustic guitar (4)
 Dan Dugmore – pedal steel guitar (5)
 Leland Sklar – bass (1-8, 10-12)
 Russ Kunkel – drums (1-8, 10-12), cowbell (3), timbales (3), congas (11)
 Steve Forman – tambourine (2), timbales (2), Mazda phone (5), cowbell (7), congas (8), waterphone (8)
 Peter Asher – timbales (4), shaker (5), backing vocals (7)
 David Sanborn – saxophone (4)
 Jesse Levy – cello (9)
 Louise Schulmann – viola (9)
 David Spinozza – string arrangements and conductor (3)
 Arif Mardin – string arrangements and conductor (10)
 Larry Touquet – cell door effects (12)
 Graham Nash – backing vocals (1)
 Alex Taylor – backing vocals (5)
 Carly Simon – backing vocals (7)
 David Lasley – backing vocals (8)
 Arnold McCuller – backing vocals (8)

Production 
 Producer – Peter Asher
 Engineer – Val Garay
 Assistant Engineers – Lincoln Clapp and George Ybarra
 Recorded and Mixed at The Sound Factory (Hollywood, California).
 Mastered by Doug Sax at The Mastering Lab (Hollywood, California).
 Art Direction and Design – John Kosh
 Photography – Mark Hanauer

Charts

Weekly charts

Year-end charts

References

1979 albums
James Taylor albums
Albums produced by Peter Asher
Columbia Records albums